Michał Waszyński (29 September 1904 – 20 February 1965) was first a film director in  Poland, then in Italy, and later (as Michael Waszynski) a producer of major American films, mainly in Spain. Known for his elegance and impeccable manners, he was known by his acquaintances as "the prince".

Waszyński was born as Mosze Waks into a Polish Jewish family in 1904 in Kowel, a small town in Volhynia (now in Ukraine), which at the time was part of Imperial Russia. As Germany occupied this part of Europe during World War I, he moved first to Warsaw and later to Berlin. As a young man he worked as an assistant director under the legendary German director F.W. Murnau. Upon his return to Poland he changed his name to Michał Waszyński and converted to Catholicism.

In the 1930s Waszyński became the most prolific film director in Poland, directing 37 of the 147 films made in Poland in that decade, or one out of four. Along with popular films in Polish produced for a wide local audience, he directed an important film in Yiddish The Dybbuk, today a monument of the rich cultural life of East European Jewry before the Holocaust.

At the beginning of World War II Waszyński escaped from Warsaw, which was being bombed by German planes, to Białystok. That city was taken in mid-September 1939 by the Germans, but within weeks, as a result of the Molotov-Ribbentrop pact, the city was given to the Soviet Union and occupied by its army. Waszyński began a new career as a theater director, first in Białystok and later in Moscow.

In the summer of 1941, after Germany invaded the Soviet Union, Waszyński joined the newly formed Polish Army of general Władysław Anders (loyal to the Polish government in Exile in London) and subsequently was relocated to Persia (Iran), and later as a soldier of the 2nd Corps of the Polish Army to Egypt and Italy. As a member of the army film unit, he filmed the Battle of Monte Cassino, where the Polish Army suffered great losses, but helped to win the day. After World War II, he stayed in Italy, where he directed a Polish-language feature film about the Battle of Monte Cassino, and then three Italian films.

Later in his career, Waszyński worked as a producer for the major American studios in Italy and (primarily) Spain, credited as Michael Waszynski. His credits include The Quiet American (1958) (associate producer), El Cid (1961), and The Fall of the Roman Empire (film) (1964) (executive producer and associate producer).

He died of a heart attack on 20 February 1965 in Madrid and was buried in a ceremonious Catholic funeral in Rome.

Filmography
 William Tell (1949)
La Grande strada (1948) Polish film produced in Italy, (1946, Italian version completed in 1948, with the collaboration of Vittorio Cottafavi); with Jadwiga Andrzejewska
 Fire Over the Sea (1947)
 The Unknown Man of San Marino (1946)
Wielka droga (1946)
Monte Cassino (1944)
Mp. Adama i Ewy (1944)
Dzieci (1943)
Pobyt generala Wl. Sikorskiego na Srodkowym Wschodzie (1943)
Polska parada (1943)
Kronika wojenna nr 1 (1942)
Marsz do wolnosci (1942)
Od pobudki do capstrzyku (1942)
The Three Hearts (1939)
U kresu drogi (1939)
The Vagabonds (1939)
Serce matki (1938)
Gehenna (1938)
Profesor Wilczur (1938)
Ostatnia brygada (1938)
Druga młodość (1938)
Kobiety nad przepaścią (1938)
Rena (1938)
The Dybbuk(1937) 
Znachor (1937)
Papa się żeni (1936)
Bohaterowie Sybiru (1936)
Dodek na froncie (1936)
30 karatów szczęścia (1936)
Będzie lepiej (1936)
Bolek i Lolek (1936)
Nie miała baba kłopotu (1935)
Panienka z poste restante (1935)
Wacuś (1935)
Jaśnie pan szofer (1935)
ABC miłości (1935)
Antek policmajster (1935)
Czarna perła (1934)
Kocha, lubi, szanuje (1934)
Pieśniarz Warszawy (1934)
Parada rezerwistów (1934)
Co mój mąż robi w nocy (1934)
Zabawka (1933)
Prokurator Alicja Horn (1933)
Dvanáct kresel (1933)
Jego ekscelencja subiekt (1933)
Sto metrów miłości (1932)
Głos pustyni (1932)
Bezimienni bohaterowie (1932)
Uwiedziona (1931)
Niebezpieczny romans (1930)
Kult ciała (1930)
Pod banderą miłości (1929)
 Jealousy (1922)

References
 

1904 births
1965 deaths
Polish film directors
Polish gay men
LGBT Roman Catholics
Converts to Roman Catholicism from Judaism
Polish people of Jewish descent
Gay Jews
Volhynian Jews
Polish expatriates in Italy
People from Kovel
People from Volhynian Governorate
Polish military personnel of World War II
20th-century Polish LGBT people